Nová Ves is a municipality and village in Český Krumlov District in the South Bohemian Region of the Czech Republic. It has about 400 inhabitants.

Administrative parts
The village of České Chalupy is an administrative part of Nová Ves.

History
The first written mention of Nová Ves is from 1379.

Notable people
Miloš Jakeš (1922–2020), communist politician

References

Villages in Český Krumlov District